The Arikaree Breaks are badlands in northwest Kansas. They form a two-to-three-mile-wide break of rough terrain between the plains of northwestern Kansas and eastern Colorado and the south sides of the Arikaree and Republican river basins. The breaks extend from Rawlins County, Kansas westward across Cheyenne County, Kansas and into Yuma County, Colorado.

The Arikaree Breaks were carved by water. The soil here called Loess was blown to the area around 10,000 years ago. The soil has a tendency to erode, forming nearly vertical cliffs. This kind of soil is also found in northeast Kansas, southwest Nebraska, and Iowa. The soil in that part of the state forms the Loess Hills.

References

External links
 Self guided tour map – Cheyenne County, Kansas, web site
 Kansas Sampler – Arikaree Breaks, Cheyenne County
 Kansas Travel – Arikaree Breaks Driving Tour with photos

Landforms of Kansas
Landforms of Cheyenne County, Kansas
Landforms of Rawlins County, Kansas
Landforms of Yuma County, Colorado
Tourist attractions in Cheyenne County, Kansas
Landforms of Colorado